Neptis najo, or Karsch's sailer, is a butterfly in the family Nymphalidae. It is found in Senegal, Guinea, Sierra Leone, Ivory Coast, Ghana and Togo. The habitat consists of forests.

References

Butterflies described in 1893
najo
Butterflies of Africa